FES or Fes may refer to:

Places 
 Fez, Morocco
 Fes railway station
 Festus Memorial Airport, in Missouri, United States
 Kingdom of Fes, now part of Morocco

Other uses 
 Fat embolism syndrome
 Feline sarcoma oncogene
 Flame emission spectroscopy, a form of atomic emission spectroscopy
 Front electric sustainer, an electric propulsion for gliders
 Flywheel energy storage
 Frente de Estudiantes Sindicalistas, a former Spanish student group
 Friedrich Ebert Foundation
 , the special forces of the Mexican Navy
 Fulham Enterprise Studio, a school in London
 Functional electrical stimulation
 Guinness Foreign Extra Stout
 Iron(II) sulfide (FeS)
 Persona 3 FES, an add-on disk for Shin Megami Tensei: Persona 3
FES (from "Phantasm"), the stage name of Japanese singer and voice actress Yui Sakakibara
 FES, the stage name of Ayase Kishimoto, a character from Chaos;Head (voiced by Yui Sakakibara)
 Fes (That '70s Show), or Fez, a charachter on That '70s Show

See also 
 FE (disambiguation)
 Fez (disambiguation)